Robert Lennox, MBE (born 30 August 1943, in Saltcoats, Ayrshire) is a Scottish former professional footballer who played for Celtic and was a member of their 1967 European Cup-winning team, known as the Lisbon Lions. He earned ten international caps for Scotland. In 2002, Celtic supporters voted him a member of the club's all-time greatest team.

Celtic
Celtic signed Lennox from Scottish Junior team Ardeer Recreation on provisional forms in 1961 at the age of 18, and he made his first team debut the following March. He went on to score 301 goals in all competitions, second only to Celtic's all-time top scorer Jimmy McGrory's total of 468 goals. Of those, 171 were scored in the Scottish league, making him the fifth-highest league scorer for Celtic. He placed third for the European Golden Boot in 1967–68.

He won eleven League medals, eight Scottish Cup medals, and five League Cup medals (scoring 63 goals in the competition) and was a member of the 1967 European Cup-winning Celtic team, the Lisbon Lions, who defeated Inter Milan 2–1 in the Estádio Nacional stadium in Lisbon, Portugal.

He played in a second European Cup final with Celtic in 1970, losing 2–1 after extra time to Feyenoord Rotterdam of the Netherlands at the San Siro stadium, Milan. He was an extremely fast winger and was known by fans as 'Buzz Bomb' or 'Lemon' as they thought he made defenders look like 'suckers'.

He left Celtic in March 1978, and moved to the United States to play for Houston Hurricane in their debut season in the NASL. After a disappointing 3 goals in 30 games for a struggling team, he got a surprise offer to rejoin Celtic in September 1978. It was a good move, as Celtic took the League Championship that year and the Scottish Cup in 1980. He was the last Lisbon Lion to retire as a player when he joined Celtic's coaching staff in November 1980.

Scotland
Lennox made his debut for Scotland in a 2–1 victory over Northern Ireland in 1966, going on to win ten international caps and scoring three goals in the process. He scored one of the goals in the famous victory over the then reigning FIFA World Cup holders England at Wembley in 1967, England's first defeat since winning the trophy. The goal made him the first Celtic player to score for Scotland at Wembley, and he later said it was a major moment in his life.

Although he thought there was no particular bias, he believes that he and several of his Celtic teammates should have received more caps than they were given.
His last appearance for Scotland was against Wales in 1970 at Hampden Park which resulted in a 0–0 draw.

Tributes
Bobby Charlton said of him,

Alfredo Di Stefano of Real Madrid said of him,

Later life
He was inducted into the Scottish Football Hall of Fame in November 2005 and was also appointed a Member of the Order of the British Empire (MBE) in 
the 1981 New Year Honours "for services to the Glasgow Celtic Football Club." Lennox published his autobiography, A Million Miles For Celtic, in 1982.

He continues his connection with Celtic as a match day host and is the Honorary President of the Houston Bobby Lennox Celtic Club. His son Gary carried on the family's footballing tradition, playing professionally for Dundee, Ayr United and Falkirk. He married his wife Kathryn (who converted to his Catholic faith) in 1967.

Career statistics

International appearances

International goals

Scores and results list Scotland's goal tally first

References

1943 births
Association football wingers
Celtic F.C. players
Celtic F.C. non-playing staff
Expatriate soccer players in the United States
Houston Hurricane players
Living people
Members of the Order of the British Empire
North American Soccer League (1968–1984) players
People educated at St Michaels Academy
People from Saltcoats
Scotland international footballers
Scottish expatriate footballers
Scottish Football Hall of Fame inductees
Scottish Football League players
Scottish Football League representative players
Scottish footballers
Scottish Roman Catholics
Footballers from North Ayrshire
Scottish league football top scorers
UEFA Champions League winning players
Scottish expatriate sportspeople in the United States
Scottish Junior Football Association players